The Skyworth EV6 (introduced as Skywell ET5) is an electric mid-size crossover SUV produced since 2021 by Chinese automotive company Skyworth Auto, a joint venture by bus manufacturer Skywell Group and consumer electronics manufacturer Skyworth Group.

Overview
The Skyworth EV6 was revealed in China in October 2020 as the Skywell ET5, until the brand's renaming in April 2021, and launched in July 2021 with a starting price of CN¥152,000 (US$22,856). Despite the name change in the domestic Chinese market, car holds the initial Skywell ET5 nameplate in Israel from October 2021, in Romania from December 2021 and in Poland from April 2022. The reason of this policy determines the will in order to avoid confuse of nameplate with the Kia EV6.

Elaris Beo
In May 2021, German company Elaris launched the Skyworth EV6 as the Elaris Beo with a starting price of €49,900 ($61,000).

Imperium SEV
Later on in June 2021, it was announced that the Skyworth EV6 will be sold in the United States and Canada by California-based company Imperium Motors as the Imperium SEV, with a starting price of US$34,990. However, a launch date was not announced.

Specifications

Battery and motor
The base Skyworth EV6 has a 55 kWh lithium battery while higher trim models have 72 kWh. The base model has a total power output of 205 kW (275 hp) and the upper variants 222 kW (298 hp). Total battery charging time is stated as 9 hours for the smaller battery and 11 hours for the larger option. All variants have a 0–100 km/h (62 mph) acceleration time of 7.9 seconds.

Interior
The interior of the EV6 features a 12.8 inch touchscreen and is equipped with the Skylink intelligent network connection system by Skyworth Group's Skyworth Technology subsidiary. The infotainment system is developed by Skyworth inhouse.

References

Cars introduced in 2021
Cars of China
Sport utility vehicles
Battery electric vehicles